The following lists events that happened in 1990 in Libya.

Incumbents
 President: Muammar al-Gaddafi
 Prime Minister: Umar Mustafa al-Muntasir (until 7 October), Abuzed Omar Dorda (starting 7 October)

Births
 4 June - Faisal Al Badri.

 
Years of the 20th century in Libya
Libya
Libya
1990s in Libya